Alexandra Bugailiskis (born January 9, 1956) is a former Canadian diplomat. In March 2022, she retired from Global Affairs Canada after a 39 year diplomatic career. In January 2023 she was appointed Chair of the International Advisory Committee of the United Nations University Institute for Water, Environment and Health (UNU-INWEH) , known as the UN's Think Tank on Water, based in Hamilton, Ontario, Canada,  From August 2017 until her retirement she served as the Canadian Ambassador to the Italian Republic, as well as Permanent Representative to the Food and Agriculture Organization of the United Nations, the World Food Programme and the International Fund for Agricultural Development, with concurrent accreditation as Ambassador to the Republic of San Marino, and to the Republic of Albania, as well as High Commissioner to Malta.

From October 2015 she served as Assistant Deputy Minister for Europe, the Middle East and the Maghreb for Global Affairs Canada. Subsequently she also assumed responsibility for the Arctic. Since 2011, Bugailiskis has concurrently been Chief Negotiator for the Canada-European Union Strategic Partnership Agreement. From September 2012 until October 2015 she served as Ambassador Extraordinary and Plenipotentiary to the Republic of Poland.  In addition to her previous Head of Mission postings in Syria, Cyprus and Cuba, she has also served abroad in Ghana (with concurrent accreditation to Benin, Togo and Liberia), and in Guatemala (with accreditation to El Salvador).

Biography 

Bugailiskis was born on January 9, 1956, in Hamilton, Ontario. She graduated from Carleton University with a Bachelor of Arts (Honours) and from the Norman Paterson School of International Affairs with a Master of Arts.

In 1990 Bugailiskis became the first recipient of the Canadian Foreign Service Officer of the Year Award for her contribution to the establishment of independence in Namibia. She was also the recipient of the 2002 Minister of Foreign Affairs Merit Award for organizing the 2001 Summit of the Americas, and the 2010 Clerk of Privy Council Commendation for Leadership on Haiti Post-earthquake reconstruction.

In 2002 she served as the Executive Director of the International Policy Framework Task Force at the Privy Council Office.

From April 2007 until August 2010, she served as Executive Coordinator for the Americas Strategy and as Assistant Deputy Minister for Latin America and the Caribbean. From September 2003 until September 2007 she was the Ambassador Extraordinary and Plenipotentiary to Cuba. She was formerly the Ambassador Extraordinary and Plenipotentiary to Syria and concurrently High Commissioner to Cyprus. At the  Department of Foreign Affairs and International Trade she had previously served as Director General for Latin America and the Caribbean and Director for Central America and the Caribbean.

In 2010, she became executive coordinator for the Inter-American Development Bank Business Opportunities Task Force. That same year she joined the Norman Patterson School of International Affairs of Carleton University as a Distinguished Senior Fellow and Diplomat in Residence where she co-edited the 2011–12 edition of Canada Among Nations, "Canada and Mexico's Unfinished Agenda".

In September 2014, she successfully concluded the negotiations which culminated in the signing of the Strategic Partnership Agreement between Canada and the European Union in October 2016 and came into provisional application on April 1, 2017.

As ADM for Europe, the Middle East and the Maghreb she was closely engaged in the resettlement of 40,000 Syrian refugees in Canada and authored a $1.6 billion three year strategy for Iraq and Syria.

In honour of Carleton University's 75th anniversary in 2017, Bugailiskis was selected as one of the Faculty of Public Affairs most distinguished and inspiring alumni.

Memberships 
Bugailiskis is the Chair of the International Advisory Committee of the United Nation University Institute for Water, Environment and Health (UNU-INWEH) in Hamilton, Canada
She is also a member of the Distinguished Advisory Council of NPSIA.  She was previously a member of the Advisory Board of the Canadian Executive MBA (CEMBA) at the SGH-Warsaw School of Economics, and of the Board of Directors of FOCAL, The Canadian Foundation for the Americas.

References

External links 

 

Carleton University alumni
Living people
1956 births
Canadian women ambassadors
Ambassadors of Canada to Syria
Ambassadors of Canada to Cuba
High Commissioners of Canada to Cyprus
Ambassadors of Canada to Poland
Ambassadors of Canada to Italy
People from Hamilton, Ontario
High Commissioners of Canada to Malta